This is a list of species of fruit flies (Tephritidae) in the genus Dacus, as of 2019. 

 Dacus abbabae Munro 1933
 Dacus abditus (Munro 1984)
 Dacus abruptus White 2009
 Dacus absonifacies (May 1956)
 Dacus acutus White 2009
 Dacus adenae (Hering 1940)
 Dacus adenionis Munro 1984
 Dacus adustus Munro 1948
 Dacus aequalis Coquillett 1909
 Dacus africanus Adams 1905
 Dacus alarifumidus Drew 1989
 Dacus albiseta White 2009
 Dacus alulapictus Drew 1989
 Dacus amberiens (Munro 1984)
 Dacus ambonensis Drew & Hancock 1998
 Dacus amphoratus (Munro 1984)
 Dacus ancoralis Leblanc & Doorenweerd 2018
 Dacus aneuvittatus (Drew 1971)
 Dacus annulatus Becker 1903
 Dacus apectus White 2006
 Dacus apiculatus White 2006
 Dacus apostata (Hering 1937)
 Dacus apoxanthus Bezzi 1924
 Dacus arabicus White 2006
 Dacus arcuatus Munro 1939
 Dacus armatus Fabricius 1805
 Dacus aspilus Bezzi 1924
 Dacus atrimarginatus Drew & Hancock 1998
 Dacus attenuatus Collart 1935
 Dacus axanthinus White & Evenhuis 1999
 Dacus axanus (Hering 1938)
 Dacus badius Drew 1989
 Dacus bakingiliensis Hancock 1985
 Dacus bannatus Wang 1990
 Dacus basifasciatus (Hering 1941)
 Dacus bellulus Drew & Hancock 1981
 Dacus bequaerti Collart 1935
 Dacus bidens (Curran 1927)
 Dacus binotatus Loew 1862
 Dacus bispinosus (Wang 1990)
 Dacus bistrigulatus Bezzi 1908
 Dacus bivittatus (Bigot 1858)
 Dacus blepharogaster Bezzi 1917
 Dacus bombastus Hering 1941
 Dacus botianus (Munro 1984)
 Dacus brevis Coquillett 1901
 Dacus brevistriga Walker 1861
 Dacus briani White 2006
 Dacus brunnalis White 2009
 Dacus calirayae Drew & Hancock 1998
 Dacus capillaris (Drew 1972)
 Dacus carnesi (Munro 1984)
 Dacus carvalhoi (Munro 1984)
 Dacus ceropegiae (Munro 1984)
 Dacus chamun (Munro 1984)
 Dacus chapini Curran 1927
 Dacus chiwira Hancock 1985
 Dacus chrysomphalus (Bezzi 1924)
 Dacus ciliatus Loew 1862
 Dacus clinophlebs Hendel 1928
 Dacus coenensis Royer & Hancock 2012
 Dacus collarti Munro 1938
 Dacus congoensis White 2006
 Dacus conopsoides de Meijere 1911
 Dacus copelandi White 2006
 Dacus crabroniformis (Bezzi 1914)
 Dacus croceus Munro 1957
 Dacus cyathus (Munro 1984)
 Dacus delicatus Munro 1939
 Dacus deltatus White 2006
 Dacus demmerezi (Bezzi 1917)
 Dacus diastatus Munro 1984
 Dacus discipennis (Walker 1861)
 Dacus discophorus (Hering 1956)
 Dacus discors Drew 1989
 Dacus discretus Drew & Romig 2013
 Dacus disjunctus (Bezzi 1915)
 Dacus dissimilis Drew 1989
 Dacus donggaliae Drew & Romig 2013
 Dacus dorjii Drew & Romig 2007
 Dacus durbanensis Munro 1935
 Dacus eclipsis (Bezzi 1924)
 Dacus elatus White 2006
 Dacus elegans (Munro 1984)
 Dacus elutissimus Bezzi 1924
 Dacus eminus Munro 1939
 Dacus erythraeus Bezzi 1917
 Dacus esakii (Shiraki 1939)
 Dacus etiennellus Munro 1984
 Dacus externellus (Munro 1984)
 Dacus famona Hancock 1985
 Dacus fasciolatus Collart 1940
 Dacus feijeni White 1998
 Dacus ficicola Bezzi 1915
 Dacus fissuratus White 2006
 Dacus flavicrus Graham 1910
 Dacus fletcheri Drew & Romig 2007
 Dacus formosanus (Tseng & Chu 1983)
 Dacus freidbergi (Munro 1984)
 Dacus frontalis Becker 1922
 Dacus fumosus Collart 1935
 Dacus fuscatus Wiedemann 1819
 Dacus fuscinervis Malloch 1932
 Dacus fuscovittatus Graham 1910
 Dacus gabonensis White 2006
 Dacus ghesquierei Collart 1935
 Dacus goergeni De Meyer, White & Goodger 2013
 Dacus guineensis Hering 1944
 Dacus gypsoides Munro 1933
 Dacus hainanus Wang & Zhao 1989
 Dacus hamatus Bezzi 1917
 Dacus hapalus (Munro 1984)
 Dacus hardyi Drew 1979
 Dacus hargreavesi (Munro 1939)
 Dacus herensis (Munro 1984)
 Dacus humeralis (Bezzi 1915)
 Dacus hyalobasis Bezzi 1924
 Dacus iaspideus Munro 1948
 Dacus icariiformis (Enderlein 1920)
 Dacus ikelenge Hancock 1985
 Dacus impar Drew 1989
 Dacus inclytus (Munro 1984)
 Dacus indecorus (Hardy 1974)
 Dacus infernus (Hardy 1973)
 Dacus inflatus Munro 1939
 Dacus inornatus Bezzi 1908
 Dacus insolitus White 2009
 Dacus insulosus Drew & Hancock 1998
 Dacus jubatus (Munro 1984)
 Dacus kakamega White 2006
 Dacus kaplanae White 2009
 Dacus kariba Hancock 1985
 Dacus katonae Bezzi 1924
 Dacus keiseri (Hering 1956)
 Dacus kurrensis White 2009
 Dacus lagunae Drew & Hancock 1998
 Dacus langi Curran 1927
 Dacus leongi Drew & Hancock 1998
 Dacus limbipennis Macquart 1843
 Dacus linearis Collart 1935
 Dacus longicornis (Wiedemann 1830)
 Dacus longistylus Wiedemann 1830
 Dacus lotus (Bezzi 1924)
 Dacus lounsburyii Coquillett 1901
 Dacus luteovittatus White 2009
 Dacus macer Bezzi 1919
 Dacus maculipterus Drew & Hancock 1998
 Dacus madagascarensis White 2006
 Dacus magnificus White 2009
 Dacus maprikensis Drew 1989
 Dacus marshalli Bezzi 1924
 Dacus masaicus Munro 1937
 Dacus mayi (Drew 1972)
 Dacus maynei Bezzi 1924
 Dacus mediovittatus White 2006
 Dacus meladassus (Munro 1984)
 Dacus melanaspis (Munro 1984)
 Dacus melanohumeralis Drew 1989
 Dacus melanopectus Drew & Romig 2013
 Dacus merzi White 2006
 Dacus mirificus (Munro 1984)
 Dacus mochii Bezzi 1917
 Dacus mulgens Munro 1932
 Dacus murphyi Drew & Hancock 1998
 Dacus nairobensis White 2006
 Dacus namibiensis Hancock & Drew 2001
 Dacus nanggalae Drew & Hancock 1998
 Dacus nanus Collart 1940
 Dacus newmani (Perkins 1937)
 Dacus nigriscutatus White 2006
 Dacus nigrolateris White 2006
 Dacus notalaxus Munro 1984
 Dacus nummularius (Bezzi 1916)
 Dacus obesus Munro 1948
 Dacus okumuae White 2006
 Dacus ooii Drew & Hancock 1998
 Dacus opacatus Munro 1948
 Dacus ortholomatus Hardy 1982
 Dacus ostiofaciens Munro 1932
 Dacus pallidilatus Munro 1948
 Dacus palmerensis Drew 1989
 Dacus pamelae (Munro 1984)
 Dacus panpyrrhus (Munro 1984)
 Dacus parvimaculatus White 2006
 Dacus pecropsis Munro 1984
 Dacus pedunculatus (Bezzi 1919)
 Dacus pergulariae Munro 1938
 Dacus persicus Hendel 1927
 Dacus petioliforma (May 1956)
 Dacus phantoma Hering 1941
 Dacus phimis (Munro 1984)
 Dacus phloginus (Munro 1984)
 Dacus pictus (Hardy 1970)
 Dacus plagiatus Collart 1935
 Dacus pleuralis Collart 1935
 Dacus polistiformis (Senior-White 1922)
 Dacus pseudapostata White 2009
 Dacus pseudomirificus White 2009
 Dacus pulchralis White 2006
 Dacus pullescens Munro 1948
 Dacus pullus (Hardy 1982)
 Dacus punctatifrons Karsch 1887
 Dacus purpurifrons Bezzi 1924
 Dacus purus (Curran 1927)
 Dacus pusillator (Munro 1984)
 Dacus pusillus (May 1965)
 Dacus quilicii White 2006
 Dacus radmirus Hering 1941
 Dacus ramanii Drew & Hancock 1998
 Dacus rubicundus Bezzi 1924
 Dacus rufoscutellatus (Hering 1937)
 Dacus rufus Bezzi 1915
 Dacus rugatus Munro 1984
 Dacus ruslan (Hering 1941)
 Dacus rutilus Munro 1948
 Dacus sakeji Hancock 1985
 Dacus salamander (Drew & Hancock 1981)
 Dacus santongae Drew & Hancock 1998
 Dacus satanas (Hering 1939)
 Dacus scaber Loew 1862
 Dacus schoutedeni Collart 1935
 Dacus secamoneae Drew 1989
 Dacus segunii White 2006
 Dacus seguyi (Munro 1984)
 Dacus semisphaereus Becker 1903
 Dacus senegalensis White 2009
 Dacus serratus (Munro 1984)
 Dacus setilatens Munro 1984
 Dacus siamensis Drew & Hancock 1998
 Dacus signatifrons (May 1956)
 Dacus siliqualactis Munro 1939
 Dacus sinensis Wang 1990
 Dacus solomonensis Malloch 1939
 Dacus sphaeristicus Speiser 1910
 Dacus sphaeroidalis (Bezzi 1916)
 Dacus sphaerostigma (Bezzi 1924)
 Dacus spissus Munro 1984
 Dacus stentor Munro 1929
 Dacus stylifer (Bezzi 1919)
 Dacus subsessilis (Bezzi 1919)
 Dacus succaelestis Ito 2011
 Dacus taui Drew & Romig 2001
 Dacus telfaireae (Bezzi 1924)
 Dacus temnopterus Bezzi 1928
 Dacus tenebricus Munro 1938
 Dacus tenebrosus Drew & Hancock 1998
 Dacus theophrastus Hering 1941
 Dacus transitorius Collart 1935
 Dacus transversalis White 2009
 Dacus triater Munro 1937
 Dacus trigonus Bezzi 1919
 Dacus trimacula Wang 1990
 Dacus triquetrus Drew & Romig 2013
 Dacus umbeluzinus (Munro 1984)
 Dacus umbrilatus Munro 1938
 Dacus umehi White 2006
 Dacus unicolor (Hendel 1927)
 Dacus velutifrons White 2009
 Dacus venetatus Munro 1939
 Dacus vertebratus Bezzi 1908
 Dacus vespiformis (Hendel 1927)
 Dacus vestigivittatus White 2009
 Dacus viator Munro 1939
 Dacus vijaysegarani Drew & Hancock 1998
 Dacus vittatus (Hardy 1974)
 Dacus wallacei White 1998
 Dacus woodi Bezzi 1917
 Dacus xanthaspis (Munro 1984)
 Dacus xanthinus White 2009
 Dacus xanthopterus (Bezzi 1915)
 Dacus xanthopus Bezzi 1924
 Dacus yangambinus Munro 1984
 Dacus yaromi White 2009
 Dacus yemenensis White 2006

References

Dacus
Dacus